"Bust Out" is the 23rd episode of the HBO original series The Sopranos and the 10th of the show's second season. It was written by Frank Renzulli, Robin Green, and Mitchell Burgess and directed by John Patterson, and originally aired on March 19, 2000.

Starring
 James Gandolfini as Tony Soprano
 Lorraine Bracco as Dr. Jennifer Melfi
 Edie Falco as Carmela Soprano
 Michael Imperioli as Christopher Moltisanti *
 Dominic Chianese as Corrado Soprano, Jr.
 Vincent Pastore as Pussy Bonpensiero
 Steven Van Zandt as Silvio Dante *
 Tony Sirico as Paulie Gualtieri
 Robert Iler as Anthony Soprano, Jr.
 Jamie-Lynn Sigler as Meadow Soprano
 Drea de Matteo as Adriana La Cerva *
 David Proval as Richie Aprile
 Aida Turturro as Janice Soprano
 Nancy Marchand as Livia Soprano

* = credit only

Guest starring
 John Ventimiglia as Artie Bucco

Also guest starring

Synopsis
Dr. Melfi tells Tony that he seems scared. A witness has identified Tony as one of two men leaving the scene of Matt's murder, but after a press report that the murder is Mafia-related, the witness retracts his statement. Pussy has another bad-tempered meeting with Skip Lipari and denies that he was the second man. Lipari orders him to record Tony admitting to the murder. 

Tony and Richie use the credit of Davey's store to buy expensive merchandise with which to pay off his debt. They plan to do this until the store goes bankrupt. Tony points out to Davey that the Executive Game was fair and Davey could just as easily have won, but he is not consoled and is close to suicide. Richie is dissatisfied with the cut he is getting from the store, and with the deal he has with the Soprano family's sanitation business. Egged on by Janice, he approaches Junior with the idea of eliminating Tony. Junior admonishes him, but Richie points out that Junior himself planned to kill Tony the previous year. Tony visits Beansie in the hospital and insists on giving him $50,000.

Davey's wife does not know about his disastrous debt to Tony. She is friends with Carmela and introduces her to her brother, Victor Musto. Carmela and Victor, who is recently widowed, are immediately attracted to each other. He is a housepainter, and she engages him to wallpaper part of her house. They suddenly kiss when they are alone in a small powder room. They agree that he will come alone the next day, without his assistant. That evening, Victor meets Davey, who confesses that he is ruined, in debt to Tony Soprano. The next day, only Victor's assistant comes to Carmela's house. 

After some cruel words to A.J., Tony feels bad and tries to get closer to him. At first A.J. resists, but they are happy together when they go out on Tony's boat.

Title reference
 A "bust out" is a fraud tactic, commonly used in the organized crime world, wherein a business' assets and lines of credit are exploited and exhausted to the point of insolvency. Richie and Tony profit from busting out Davey Scatino's sporting goods store in this episode.
 "Bust out" is also a poker term that Poker News defines as: "To lose all your chips and thus be eliminated from a tournament."

Cultural references
In bed, Carmela is reading Memoirs of a Geisha.
Livia mentions Rose Kennedy, the wealthy matriarch of the Kennedy family.
When Richie visits Junior at his home, Junior is watching the CBS daytime soap opera The Bold and the Beautiful.
Carmela tells Tony about a Harvard study examining the importance of the father-son relationship she read about in Time.
Tony mentions "The Scorpion and the Frog" to David Scatino.
At home, the eyewitness is reading Anarchy, State, and Utopia, by Robert Nozick.
 Richie tells Janice that Mafia rules dictate that an underling cannot kill a boss. She responds, "Tell that to Paul Castellano", referring to the assassination of Castellano by John Gotti.
 A.J. is shown playing the Dreamcast game Flag to Flag.

Music
 The piano instrumental playing at Nuovo Vesuvio during lunch with Carmela and Christine Scatino is "Cast Your Fate to the Wind".
 The song "Con te partirò" by Andrea Bocelli appears for the third time this season, played as Carmela thinks about and receives a phone call from the handyman.  This song was especially prominent in "Commendatori", playing (among other places) when Carmela and her friends discussed hoping to be free of their husbands.
 The music playing during the scene wherein the witness realizes the murder victim was a Mafia associate is the second movement from Anton Webern's Variations for Piano, Op. 27.
 When Carmela is preparing the food for her lunch with Vic Musto, "You're Still the One" by Shania Twain is playing in the background.
 The song played over the end credits is "Wheel in the Sky" by Journey; this song also played in the scene of painters wallpapering the Sopranos' dining room.

Filming locations 
Listed in order of first appearance:

 Garden State Plaza in Paramus, New Jersey
 Ramsey Outdoor in Paramus, New Jersey
 North Caldwell, New Jersey
 Washington Middle School in Harrison, New Jersey
 Long Island City, Queens
 Satin Dolls in Lodi, New Jersey
 Great Kills, Staten Island

References

External links
"Bust Out"  at HBO

The Sopranos (season 2) episodes
2000 American television episodes
Television episodes directed by John Patterson (director)

fr:Dépôt de bilan (Les Soprano)